Carex × ligniciensis is a hybrid species of sedge. Its parents are Carex buekii and Carex nigra.

References 

ligniciensis
Flora of Germany
Flora of Hungary
Flora of Italy
Flora of Poland
Plant nothospecies